Alfred Beresford (1850–1935) was an Anglican priest in Australia during the late nineteenth and early twentieth centuries.

Beresford was born in Tasmania and  ordained deacon in 1876 and priest in 1877. His first post was a curacy at St David's Cathedral, Hobart.   He served incumbencies at Bothwell and Forth and Launceston. He was Archdeacon of Launceston from 1907 until 1928.

References

1850 births
19th-century Australian Anglican priests
1935 deaths
Anglican archdeacons in Tasmania
20th-century Australian Anglican priests